Ina Golub, born Ina Joan Rudman (October 28, 1938 in Newark, New Jersey; died October 20, 2015 in New Jersey) was a fiber artist who specialized in Judaica.

Life
Golub, the daughter of Frieda and Irving Rudman, grew up in Irvington and Newark, New Jersey, and graduated from Newark's Weequahic High School. She earned a bachelor's degree in art education from Montclair State University in 1960 and a master's degree in fine arts with a major in fiber arts and a minor in metal from Indiana University in 1965. From 1960 to 1963, she taught at Kawameeh Junior High School in Union, New Jersey, where she met her husband Herbert Golub (1932-June 22, 2010), who was a music teacher at the school. They married in 1962. Herbert Golub was later a music professor at Kean College.

A resident of Mountainside, New Jersey, Golub died on October 20, 2015.

Work
In 1965, Ina Golub began pursuing art full-time. Golub custom-designed fiber art, primarily Jewish ceremonial objects such as Torah mantles, wedding canopies, wall hangings, prayer shawls, as well as textiles with secular content for synagogues, museums and private collectors. She worked in tapestry, hand weaving, applique, quilting, stitchery, beadwork and fabric painting. Her first commission was the renovation of the ark at Temple Sharey Tefilo-Israel in South Orange, New Jersey. The Yeshiva University Museum mounted a 30-year retrospective on her work in 1996. Her work is in 40 synagogues throughout the United States, and in the permanent collections of the Yeshiva University Museum and the Jewish Museum.

Awards
Philip and Sylvia Spertus Judaica Prize (1998)
Union County Fine Arts Award (2009)

References

External links
Catalog of 1996 career retrospective at Yeshiva University Museum, New York
Guide to the Ina Golub Papers at the Yeshiva University Museum, New York
Archived Website at the Internet Archive

1938 births
2015 deaths
20th-century American Jews
20th-century American women artists
21st-century American Jews
21st-century American women artists
American weavers
Artists from Newark, New Jersey
Indiana University alumni
Montclair State University alumni
People from Irvington, New Jersey
People from Mountainside, New Jersey
Weequahic High School alumni
Women textile artists
Jewish American artists